This is a list of episodes for the premiere season (1976–77) of the NBC television series Quincy, M.E..

The first two seasons of this series were released on DVD together in a single box set by Universal Home Video.

These 75-minute episodes originally aired as part of the NBC Mystery Movie lineup. When they were added to the syndicated lineup, they were edited to fit an hour slot and had the closing credits redone to remove the NBC Mystery Movie references, but all four are included in their original versions on the DVDs.

Episodes

References

External links
 

1976 American television seasons
1977 American television seasons